The Forgotten King (Georgian: დავიწყებული მეფე) is a 2013 film set in Georgia in the early 12th century. The film broke the world record for being made in 105 minutes using continuous frame. It was directed by Nikoloz Khomasuridze.

Plot and themes
A Georgian couple travel through time; historical figures including Queen Tamar, Shota Rustaveli, Ilia Chavchavadze, Stalin, and Hitler appear as Khomasuridze connects issues in present-day Georgia to its past. The film includes passages from Rustaveli's classic poem "The Knight in the Tiger's Skin".

Production
The Forgotten King consists of a continuous 105-minute shot, with exteriors in the Tbilisi streets and interiors in a pavilion.

Cast
Misha Arobelidze as Soviet Soldier#2
Kakha Abuashvili as Soviet Soldier#4
Temo Barbaqadze as Lavrenti Beria
Elguja Burduli as Shota Rustaveli
Nugzar Chikovani as Ilia Chavchavadze
Givi Chuguashvili as Jacques De Molay, Grand Master of the Knights Templar

See also
 List of historical drama films

References

External links
 

Drama films from Georgia (country)
2013 films